Emanuil Manev (born 19 April 1992) is a Bulgarian professional footballer who plays as a midfielder for FC Sozopol. He has represented Bulgaria at U-19 and U-21 level.

Career
On 25 June 2017, Manev signed with Nesebar.

On 17 June 2018, he joined Tsarsko Selo.

Club statistics

References

External links 
 
 

1992 births
Living people
Bulgarian footballers
Bulgaria youth international footballers
Bulgaria under-21 international footballers
FC Pomorie players
Neftochimic Burgas players
FK Ústí nad Labem players
FC Sozopol players
PFC Nesebar players
FC Tsarsko Selo Sofia players
First Professional Football League (Bulgaria) players
Second Professional Football League (Bulgaria) players
Czech National Football League players
Bulgarian expatriate footballers
Expatriate footballers in the Czech Republic
Association football midfielders
Bulgarian expatriate sportspeople in the Czech Republic
People from Karnobat